Break Sokos Hotel Eden was a spa hotel located in the Hietasaari district,  west of Oulu centre in the Nallikari camping area. This Finland subtropical sea spa was constructed in 1989 by the designer Paavo Karjalainen.

The spa was originally known as The Eden Nallikari Sea Spa. Subsequent names have included "Spa Hotel Eden", "Oulu Eden Spa Hotel", "Holiday Club Oulu Eden", and "Sokos Hotel Eden". The hotel is currently named Break Sokos Hotel Eden.

Services
Accommodations include 170 rooms, the majority with a view of the Baltic Sea. There are 100 standard rooms, 67 superior rooms and three suites.

History

In 1988 construction began, lasting until the opening on August 18, 1989.

In 1993 Eden welcomed its millionth customer.

In 1998 a fire in the hotel's lobby bar destroyed the restaurant.

In 2002 a new wing containing 69 new rooms was added.

In 2006 Eden was bought by Sokotel from Holiday Club.

In December 2021 the spa ceased operations.

References

External links

Buildings and structures in Oulu
Hotels in Finland
Hotel spas
Hietasaari, Oulu